The 2022 Men's Oceania Youth Handball Championship was held at Rarotonga, Cook Islands between 5 and 9 December 2022.

This is the fifth ever championship. The competition participants were defending champions New Zealand, the hosts Cook Islands, Australia, Tahiti New Caledonia and Tonga.

Tahiti won their second title in the round robin event. Hosts New Caledonia were third followed by New Zealand, the Cook Islands and Tonga. The Under-18 competition was won by Tahiti.

Oceania was not granted a spot in the 2023 Men's Youth World Handball Championship, but Tahiti have qualified for the IHF Inter-Continental Trophy.

Results

Rankings

References

Oceania Youth Handball Championship
Handball